John O'Ferrell Store, also known as "Olde Store", is a historic general store located at Mongo, Springfield Township, LaGrange County, Indiana.  It was built in 1832, and is a two-story, Greek Revival style frame building, with later 19th century additions.  The replacement shed roofed front porch was added in the 1930s.  Over its history, the store served as a post office, distillery, and informal courtroom.

It was listed in the National Register of Historic Places in 1975.

References

Commercial buildings on the National Register of Historic Places in Indiana
Greek Revival architecture in Indiana
Commercial buildings completed in 1832
Buildings and structures in LaGrange County, Indiana
National Register of Historic Places in LaGrange County, Indiana